rBCG30 (recombinant Bacillus Calmette-Guérin 30) is a prospective vaccine against tuberculosis created by a team headed by Marcus A. Horwitz at UCLA.  It is a live vaccine, consisting of BCG genetically modified to produce abundant amounts of a 30kDa antigen (Antigen 85B) that has been shown to produce a strong immune response in animals and humans.  The vaccine completed a Phase I double-blind randomized controlled clinical trial that demonstrated that rBCG30 was safe and immunogenic; during nine months of follow-up, rBCG30, but not BCG, induced significantly increased Antigen 85B-specific immune responses in eight immunological assays (blood lymphocyte proliferation, antibody responses by ELISA, interferon-gamma producing CD4+ and CD8+ T cells ex vivo, central memory CD4+ and CD8+ T cells, interferon-gamma ELISPOT responses, and the capacity of T cells to activate macrophages to inhibit mycobacterial intracellular multiplication).

References

Tuberculosis vaccines